Joseph V. DiPenta (born February 25, 1979) is a former Canadian professional ice hockey defenceman. DiPenta played 4 seasons in the National Hockey League and 8 seasons in the American Hockey League. He is one of only few hockey players to have won both the Calder Cup and Stanley Cup during their career.

Early life 
DiPenta was born in Barrie, Ontario in 1979. He began playing hockey at age four and later moved to Cole Harbour, Nova Scotia at age seven.

Playing career

Junior 
DiPenta played for the Smiths Falls Bears of the Central Canada Hockey League in the Canadian Junior Hockey League. After receiving the CJHL Scholarship award in 1997, DiPenta went on to play for Boston University. During his time with Boston, he was drafted 61st overall by the Florida Panthers in the 1998 NHL Entry Draft. 

DiPenta made his major junior debut with the Halifax Mooseheads of the Quebec Major Junior Hockey League in 1999-00 and finished the season with 13 goals and 43 assists in 63 games. As the hosts, DiPenta and the Mooseheads played in the 2000 Memorial Cup. Halifax was eliminated however by the OHL's Barrie Colts.

Professional 

DiPenta made his professional debut in the AHL with the Philadelphia Flyers affiliate team, the Philadelphia Phantoms. He later joined the Atlanta Thrashers affiliate, the Chicago Wolves in 2001-02 and finished with 2 assists as the Wolves went on to win the 2002 Calder Cup.

DiPenta made his NHL debut with Atlanta in 2002-03, scoring 2 points in just 3 games before being sent back down to the Chicago Wolves and then joining the Manitoba Moose.

DiPenta joined the Mighty Ducks of Anaheim for the 2005-06 season along with legends such as Scott Niedermayer and Teemu Selänne. With Chris Pronger joining the following season, the newly renamed, Anaheim Ducks captured their first Stanley Cup in franchise history, defeating the Ottawa Senators in five games. This gave DiPenta his first and only Stanley Cup title. 

In the 2008–09 season, DiPenta signed a one-year contract with Frölunda HC of Elitserien.

On July 11, 2009, DiPenta attempted a return to the NHL signing a one-year contract with the Buffalo Sabres.

As a free agent from the Sabres, DiPenta made a return of sorts to the Ducks organization, signing a one-year contract with the team's AHL affiliate, the Syracuse Crunch, on August 26, 2010.

Personal life 
DiPenta is a Christian. He has spoken about his faith publicy and currently works as a professional EOS implementer.

Career statistics

Awards and honors

Transactions
 June 27, 1998 — Drafted by the Florida Panthers in the third round, 61st overall.
 July 12, 2000 — Signed by the Philadelphia Flyers as a free agent.
 March 5, 2002 — Traded to the Atlanta Thrashers for Jarrod Skalde.
 August 19, 2004 — Signed by the Vancouver Canucks as a free agent.
 August 11, 2005 — Signed by the Mighty Ducks of Anaheim as a free agent.
 August 14, 2007 — Re-signed by the Anaheim Ducks as a free agent to a one-year contract.
 July 15, 2008 — Signed by Frölunda HC as a free agent.
 July 11, 2009 — Signed by the Buffalo Sabres as a free agent.

References

External links

Joe DiPenta's Official Website

1979 births
Living people
Anaheim Ducks players
Atlanta Thrashers players
Boston University Terriers men's ice hockey players
Canadian ice hockey defencemen
Chicago Wolves players
Florida Panthers draft picks
Frölunda HC players
Halifax Mooseheads players
Ice hockey people from Simcoe County
Manitoba Moose players
Mighty Ducks of Anaheim players
Philadelphia Phantoms players
Portland Pirates players
Sportspeople from Barrie
Stanley Cup champions
Syracuse Crunch players
Canadian expatriate ice hockey players in Sweden